The Municipal Borough of Farnworth was a local government district centred on the town of Farnworth in the administrative county of Lancashire, England. A local board of health had been established for Farnworth in 1863, which was reconstituted as an urban district in 1899, before being  granted a charter of incorporation to become a municipal borough in 1939. Following abolition of the local authority in 1974, Farnworth became an unparished area of the Metropolitan Borough of Bolton in Greater Manchester.

History
Lying within the boundaries of the historic county of Lancashire since the early 12th century, Farnworth constituted a township in the civil and ecclesiastical parish of Deane. In 1837, Farnworth became part of the Bolton Poor Law Union which took responsibility for funding the Poor Law in that Union area.

Under the Local Government Act 1858, a local board of health was adopted for the township of Farnworth in 1863. In 1866, Farnworth was also given the status of a civil parish. After the Public Health Act 1875 was passed by Parliament in that year, Farnworth Local Board of Health assumed extra duties as an urban sanitary district, although the Local Board's title did not change.

In 1899, following the implementation of the Local Government Act 1894, Farnworth Local Board was reconstituted as an elected urban district council of eighteen members. Farnworth Urban District Council had six electoral wards, each denoted by points of the compass (North, North-East, North-West, South, South-East, and South-West wards), and each represented by three councillors. In 1939, Farnworth was granted a charter of incorporation to become a municipal borough.

Under the Local Government Act 1972, the Municipal Borough of Farnworth was abolished on 1 April 1974 and its former area was transferred to Greater Manchester to become an unparished area of the Metropolitan Borough of Bolton.

Demography

Lists of office holders

Chairmen of Farnworth Local Board

Chairmen of Farnworth Urban District Council

Mayors of the Municipal Borough of Farnworth

Neighbouring districts
The Municipal Borough of Farnworth was surrounded to the north and west by the County Borough of Bolton, to the northeast by Little Lever Urban District, to the southeast by Kearsley Urban District, and to the south by Little Hulton Urban District  until 1933, then by Worsley Urban District.

Notes

External links
Boundary Map of Farnworth UD/MB

Farnworth
Municipal boroughs of England
Local government in the Metropolitan Borough of Bolton
History of Lancashire
Local Government Districts created by the Local Government Act 1858
Districts of England created by the Local Government Act 1894
Districts of England abolished by the Local Government Act 1972